FIRST is a mnemonic acronym for business communications.

F - Frequent

I - Interactive

R - Responsive

S - Structured

T - Timely

This mnemonic first appeared in the IBM OS/2 magazine article by Oleg Vishnepolsky in the November 1989 issue.

References

Promotion and marketing communications
Mnemonics